Edith Bruck (born 3 May 1931) is a Hungarian-born writer, director and Holocaust survivor. She has lived most of her life in Italy and writes in Italian.

Early life
The daughter of poor Jewish parents, she was born Edit Steinschreiber in the village of Tiszabercel near the Ukrainian border. In 1944, with her parents, two brothers and a sister, she was sent to Auschwitz, where her mother died. The family was transferred to Dachau where her father died, then to Christianstadt and finally Bergen-Belsen, where the remaining children were liberated by the Allies in 1945. One brother also died in the concentration camps.  She returned to Hungary and then went to Czechoslovakia, where another sister was living with her family.

Career
In 1959, she published her autobiography Chi ti ama così, later translated as Who loves you like this (2001). 

In 1971, she wrote her first play, Sulla porta. Bruck was a founder of the Teatro della Maddalena theatre in Rome. From the 1970s to the 1990s, she worked for the RAI as a director and screenwriter.

She has translated works by the Hungarian poets Attila József and Miklós Radnóti into Italian. Her own work has been translated into other languages including Hungarian, Danish, Dutch, English and German.

Personal life
When she was 16, she married Milan Grün and moved to Israel; the couple divorced the following year. She then married Dany Roth, but that marriage also ended in divorce. She next married an acquaintance named Bruck to postpone her compulsory military service; she had divorced him by the time that she was 20 but kept his surname. In 1954, Bruck moved to Rome and later married Italian writer and director Nelo Risi.

Selected works 
 Chi ti ama così, novel (1959) (Who Loves You Like This (2001) tr. Thomas Kelso)
 Andremo in città, short stories (1962), title story adapted as a film in 1966
 Due stanze vuote, short stories (1974), finalist for the Strega Prize
 Per il tuo bene, play (1975)
 Mio splendido disastro, novel (1979)
 Lettera alla madre, epistolary novel, (1988), received the Rapallo Carige Prize
 Nuda proprietà (1993), finalist for the Strega Prize
 Il silenzio degli amanti, novel (1997)
 L’amore offeso, novel (2002)
 Quante stelle c’è nel cielo, novel (2009), received the Viareggio Prize, adapted to film as Anita B.

Filmography 
 Improvviso, director (1979)
 Quale Sardegna?, director (1983)
  Fotografando Patrizia, writer  (1984)
 Altare per la madre, director (1986)
 Per odio per amore, writer (1991)

References

External links 
 
 - EDITH BRUCK - Rivista Primi Piani
 [https://migrapolis-deutschland.de/edith-bruck-eine-stimme-der-shoah/ - Edith Bruck, eine Stimme der Shoah - by Giorgia Sogos Wiquel

1932 births
Living people
Italian women novelists
Italian women short story writers
Italian women film directors
Italian dramatists and playwrights
Viareggio Prize winners
Hungarian Jews
Auschwitz concentration camp survivors
Bergen-Belsen concentration camp survivors
Dachau concentration camp survivors
Gross-Rosen concentration camp survivors
Italian women dramatists and playwrights
20th-century Italian novelists
20th-century Italian women writers
20th-century Italian dramatists and playwrights
21st-century Italian dramatists and playwrights
21st-century Italian novelists
21st-century Italian women writers
Hungarian emigrants to Italy
People from Szabolcs-Szatmár-Bereg County
Italian autobiographers
Women autobiographers
Translators from Hungarian
Translators to Italian
20th-century translators
20th-century Italian short story writers
21st-century Italian short story writers
Officers Crosses of the Order of Merit of the Federal Republic of Germany